Dhamnand is a small village within the Khed Taluka in the state of Maharashtra, India. It is situated in the Ratnagiri District beside the Vaki and Nagzari Rivers. Its population is about 4500, with the main industries being farming and forestry. The village god, or Gramdevata, is Zolai Devi.

Subdivisions
Dhamnand is further divided into many Wadis:

 Mhapadiwadi- Maruti 
 Mulanda - the temple of Kalika Devi
 Payarwadi - Dubleshvar Shiva Temple, Saibaba Temple and private temples as well
 Tambad
 Raw -Zolae Devi 
 Lingayat
 Khadak
 Rohidas
 Kadam
 Sutarwadi - Virat Vishvakarma Temple is in this zone 
 Rajwada-Kajufata
 Jadhavwadi- Shri Ram Temple
 Vaglacha Mal
 Gudhyacha Aad- Shri Datta Temple, Vir Hanuman Temple
 Ratamba Mal
 Ganpati- Lord Ganesh Temple
 Niwachi
 Shindewadi - Lord Ganapati Temple
 Boudhawadi - Thatagat Samaj Mandir
 Brahminwadi – Vitthal Rakhumae Temple

References

Villages in Ratnagiri district